Kangigutsak Island is an uninhabited Baffin Island offshore island located in the Arctic Archipelago in Nunavut's Qikiqtaaluk Region. It lies in Cumberland Sound, across the mouth of Robert Peel Inlet. Shakshukuk Island lies north.

References

External links 
 Kangigutsak Island in the Atlas of Canada - Toporama; Natural Resources Canada

Islands of Baffin Island
Islands of Cumberland Sound
Uninhabited islands of Qikiqtaaluk Region